The following outline is provided as an overview of and topical guide to smoking:

Smoking – activity of intentionally burning and inhaling a small quantity of a substance, most often tobacco.

Description 

Smoking can be described as all of the following:

 Preventable cause of death
 Recreational drug use

Types of smoking 

 Tobacco smoking – method of consuming tobacco, from which small amounts are burned and the smoke inhaled.
 Cannabis smoking – method of consuming cannabis, from which small amounts are burned and the smoke inhaled.

History of smoking 

History of smoking

General smoking concepts 

 Cigarette
 Cigarette taxes in the United States
 Tobacco and health
 History of commercial tobacco in the United States
 Inflight smoking
 Religious views on smoking
 Smoking pipe
 Smoking ban
 Smoking cessation
 Smoking fetish
 Vaporizer
 Herbal cigarette

Smoking-related organizations

Smoking-related publications

Persons influential in smoking

See also 

 Smoke

References

External links 

Smoking
Health-related lists
Smoking
Smoking